Events from the year 1820 in Sweden

Incumbents
 Monarch – Charles XIV John

Events
 - Foundation of the Swedbank
 - Nattvardsbarnen by Esaias Tegnér.
 - Markalls sömnlösa nätter (1820–21) by Per Adam Wallmark.
 - Runesvärdet av Karl August Nicander
 - Senare dikter af Vitalis by Erik Sjöberg
 - The Wolf of Gysinge killed its first victim

Births
 6 October – Jenny Lind, opera singer (died 1887) 
 - Anna-Kajsa Norman, folk musician (died 1903) 
 - Kloka Anna i Vallåkra, religious visionary and natural healer (died 1896)

Deaths
 16 February – Georg Carl von Döbeln, war hero (born 1758) 
 25 May – Eric Ruuth, governor general (born 1746) 
 - Charlotte Du Rietz, love interest of Gustav III (born 1744)

References

External links

 
Years of the 19th century in Sweden
Sweden